"M's" (stylized "M'$") is a song by American rapper ASAP Rocky, taken from Rocky's second studio album At. Long. Last. ASAP (2015). The song, produced by Honorable C.N.O.T.E. alongside Mike Dean, features a guest appearance from fellow American rapper Lil Wayne on the album version. The song was originally released as a promotional single without Lil Wayne on April 10, 2015. Upon the release of the album, high downloads resulted in the song peaking at number 6 on the US Billboard Bubbling Under Hot 100 Singles chart.

Chart performance

Release history

References

Hip hop songs
ASAP Rocky songs
2015 songs
Lil Wayne songs
Songs written by ASAP Rocky
Songs written by Lil Wayne
Songs written by Mike Dean (record producer)